Stenalia ermischi is a beetle in the genus Stenalia of the family Mordellidae. It was described in 1942 by Franciscolo.

References

ermischi
Beetles described in 1942